This page lists the World Best Year Performance in the year 2003 in both the men's and the women's hammer throw. One of the main event during this season were the 2002 European Athletics Championships in Munich, Germany, where the final of the men's competition was held on August 7, 2002. The women had their final two days later, on August 9, 2002.

Men

Records

2002 World Year Ranking

Women

Records

2002 World Year Ranking

References
IAAF
tilastopaja
apulanta
apulanta
hammerthrow.wz

2002
Hammer Throw Year Ranking, 2002